Hanen Run is a  long 2nd order tributary to Dunkle Run in Washington County, Pennsylvania.  This is the only stream of this name in the United States.

Variant names
According to the Geographic Names Information System, it has also been known historically as:
Hanan Run
Haynon Run

Course
Hanen Run rises about 0.75 miles west of West Middletown, Pennsylvania, in Washington County and then flows southeast to join Dunkle Run about 1 mile northeast of Acheson.

Watershed
Hanen Run drains  of area, receives about 40.0 in/year of precipitation, has a wetness index of 315.21, and is about 43% forested.

See also
List of Pennsylvania Rivers

References

Rivers of Pennsylvania
Rivers of Washington County, Pennsylvania